(Give peace, Lord) is the incipit of two different Latin texts, a hymn and an introit. Both have been the base for compositions to be used in church liturgy, beginning with chant. Paraphrased versions of the hymn were created by Martin Luther in German in 1529, "Verleih uns Frieden", also set by several composers. In English, the hymn entered the Book of Common Prayer, "Give peace in our time, O Lord".

History and musical settings

Latin

Settings of the Latin hymn include Da pacem Domine by Arvo Pärt (2004) and Da pacem Domine by Juan María Solare (2018).

The inscription "da pacem domine" appears beside the figure of an angel playing on lute, on the so-called Jankovich saddle (c. 1408-1420), attributed to King Sigismund of Hungary.

German

Martin Luther wrote a paraphrase in German, "Verleih uns Frieden". A second stanza, beginning "Gieb unsern Fürsten", was later added to Luther's text by Johann Walter and in this form the hymn endured as a chorale, appearing in the cantatas of Johann Sebastian Bach. Other settings include a motet in the collection Geistliche Chormusik by Heinrich Schütz (published 1648), and Verleih uns Frieden, a chorale cantata by Mendelssohn.

English

A version in English, "Give peace in our time, O Lord", is part of the Book of Common Prayer. The similar phrase Peace for our time has been used in political contexts.

The introit 

See also 

 List of hymns by Martin Luther

References

Sources 

 Da pacem Domine text and translations in the Choral Public Domain Library
 Da pacem Domine (Introit) text and translations in the Choral Public Domain Library
 Verleih uns Frieden German hymn in the Choral Public Domain Library

6th century in music
7th century in music
Latin-language Christian hymns

16th-century hymns in German